Green Party Taiwan is a political party in Taiwan established on 25 January 1996. Although the party is sympathetic to Taiwan nationalism and shares a number of centre-left positions with the Pan-Green Coalition, the party emphasizes campaigning primarily on social and environmental issues. The party is not a member of, and should not be confused with, the Pan-Green Coalition. Green Party Taiwan is a member of the Asia Pacific Greens Federation and participates in the Global Greens.

Much of the 400-strong membership are affiliated with the non-governmental organisation sector of Taiwanese society, as well as from academia and the youth community.

Electoral history
In 1996, Green Party Taiwan’s Kao Meng-ting was elected to the National Assembly. However, he left the party in 1997.

In the 2008 legislative election, the Green Party of Taiwan formed a red-green coalition with a labour-led organization Raging Citizens Act Now! (人民火大行動聯盟), but failed to win any seats.

In the 2012 legislative election, Green Party Taiwan garnered 1.7% of the party vote. While still far short of the 5% threshold to win a seat in the legislature, this makes it the largest extraparliamentary party in Taiwan. Its best showing is in Ponso no Tao where Taiwan’s nuclear waste storage facility is located. There, the party collected 35.76% of the party votes due to its strong antinuclear stance.

In the 2014 local elections, the party won two seats. Wang Hao-yu was elected to the Taoyuan City council and Jay Chou to the Hsinchu County Council.

In the 2016 general election, the party ran in a coalition with the newly founded centre-left Social Democratic Party and fielded candidates in both constituency races and the nationwide party ballot. The coalition garnered 2.5% of the party vote without winning any seats.

In the 2020 general election the Green Party nominated five, young professionals, including famed psychologist Cheng Hui-wen and party founder Kao Cheng-yan. They got 2.4% of the votes and didn’t win any seats. They were the second largest party that didn’t win a seat.

The Green Party averages around 3% of total votes cast in metropolitan urban areas, with support in rural areas, such as Orchid Island, as high as 35.8%.

List of chairpersons
Kao Cheng-yan, 1996–1997 and 2003–2004 Chair. Professor of Computer Science at National Taiwan University; Green Party Taiwan's founding chair; former director of Taiwan Environmental Protection Union; candidate for the Legislative Yuan in 1998 and 2001.
Shin-Min Shih, 1998 Chair. Professor of Chemical Engineering at National Taiwan University; President of the Institute of Environment and Resource; former Director of Taiwan Environmental Protection Union;
Kuang-Yu Chen, 1999–2000 Chair. candidate for the Taipei City Councilor in 1998.
Ayo Cheng, 2001–2002 Chair. Dean of College of Environment and Ecology at National University of Tainan; former director of Taiwan Environmental Protection Union.
Yenwen Peng, 2005 Chair. Assistant professor of Public Administration and Management at Shih Hsin University; candidate for the Taipei City Councilor in 1998.
Sam Lin, 2006 Co-chair. Former Chair of Taiwan Ecology Conservation Union.
Jolan Hsieh, 2006 Co-chair. Assistant professor of Indigenous Culture at National Dong Hua University.
Chen Man-li, 2007 Co-chair. Former president of the Homemakers' Union and Foundation; former president of the National Union of Taiwan Women Association; candidate for the Legislative Yuan in 2008. Elected to the legislature in 2016 after joining the Democratic Progressive Party.
Huei-Sean Hong, 2007 Co-chair. President of Pingtung Environmental Protection Union; candidate for the Legislative Yuan in 2004.
Bau-Ju Chung, 2008–2009 Co-chair. President of Hualien Environmental Protection Union; candidate for the Hualien County Councilor in 1998, 2002.
Hong-Lin Chang, 2008–2009 Co-chair. Secretary General of the Taiwan NPO Self-regulation Alliance; former Secretary General of the Society of Wildness; candidate for the Taipei City Councilor in 2006.
Gelinda Chang, co-chair for 2011; educator.
Robin Winkler, co-chair for 2011 and 2012; lawyer and founder of Wild at Heart Legal Defense Association; naturalised Taiwanese citizen.
Karen Yu, co-chair from 2012 to 2015; social entrepreneur and co-founder of Öko-Green Café, a Fairtrade coffee shop. Elected to the Legislative Yuan in 2016 as a member of the Democratic Progressive Party. 
Lee Keng-cheng, co-chair from 2013 to 2017; artist, educator and founder of Citizen of the Earth Taiwan, an environmental organisation.
Chang Yu-jing, co-chair from 2015 to 2017; environmental activist.

Notable persons
 Linda Gail Arrigo, international affairs officer for the party; ex-wife of Shih Ming-teh.
 Thomas Chan, at-large candidate for the legislature in the 2016 election. Although not elected, he was later appointed as deputy minister for the Environmental Protection Administration, in the first cabinet of the Tsai Ing-wen administration led by premier Lin Chuan.
 Peter Huang: famous for his failed assassination attempt against Chiang Ching-kuo in 1970; erstwhile National Policy Advisor on human rights issues to the President of the Republic of China; avid supporter of the party since it was founded.
 Pan Han-Chiang (潘翰疆), member of the Central Supervisory Committee of the party, 1999; erstwhile vice secretary-general of the Taiwan Environmental Protection Union. He split from Green Party Taiwan in 2014 to form the Trees Party.
 Kao Meng-ting, who won a seat in Yunlin County for Green Party Taiwan in the ROC National Assembly in 1996, but later defected to the Democratic Progressive Party.
 Lin Cheng-hsiu (林正修), erstwhile Research, Development and Evaluation Commission Director, Taipei City (apparently the only party member holding a public office in 2004); he ran unsuccessfully as an independent candidate in the 2004 legislative election. In 2007, Lin was a campaign manager for Pan-Blue Coalition's presidential candidate Ma Ying-jeou.
 Sinan Mavivo (希婻‧瑪飛洑; 賴美惠), the top candidate of the Green Party Taiwan list in the legislative election 2012, is an anti-nuclear campaigner. She is of the Tao people from Pongso no Tao.
 Calvin Wen (溫炳原), a former Secretary-General of the Party, competed in the by-election in Daan District due to the resignation of Diane Lee in 2009.
Rita Jhang (張竹芩) — also known as Zukkim Zong (spelled in Hakka), or JhuCin Jhang (Mandarin Chinese) — served as Secretary-General of Green Party Taiwan from April 1, 2020 to May 31, 2021. She is the current president of the North American Taiwan Studies Association and co-host of the feminist podcast "Z Green Party (Z色派對)".  
Zoe Lee (李菁琪), current Secretary-General of Green Party Taiwan, cannabis advocate and podcaster, and Taiwan's first "weed lawyer" whose law firm only takes on clients accused of cannabis-related crimes.

See also
 Politics of the Republic of China
 List of environmental organizations
 List of political parties in Taiwan
 Elections in Taiwan
 Trees Party
 Global Greens
 Green party

Notes

References

 Dafydd Fell (2021) Taiwan's Green Parties: Alternative Politics in Taiwan. Routledge.

External links

 Taipei Times (2008-01-14): Election fallout: Green Party stays upbeat despite poor performance
 Which Ways Forward for Green Politics in Taiwan?

Green political parties
Political parties in Taiwan
Political parties established in 1996
1996 establishments in Taiwan
Global Greens member parties
Environmentalism in Taiwan
Progressive parties in Taiwan
Taiwanese nationalist political parties